Gareth "Gaz" Brookfield (born 4 July 1979) is an English folk and rock musician, who is based in Bristol, England.  He is usually a solo artist, playing acoustic guitar, but is regularly joined by fiddle player Ben Wain and also has a full band, the Company of Thieves. He is also followed on his expansive tours by a loyal following calling themselves "The Land Pirates".

Biography
In his early career, Brookfield played with a number of bands but moved to a solo career in 2006. In 2010, he won Acoustic Magazine's Singer-Songwriter of the Year award, which also won him a place on the Big Top stage at Beautiful Days Festival, where he played twice more since. He played at other major festivals such as Glastonbury, and supported artists such as The Levellers, New Model Army, Ferocious Dog, and Frank Turner. In 2011, he became the first (and to this date only) unsigned solo act to sell out the 450-capacity Fleece in Bristol, an achievement which he has since repeated four more times with his Christmas shows; the 2014 show was also his 1,000th gig. In 2017, due to demand, the Christmas show was moved to the 750-capacity Bristol Bierkeller which sold out as well. With the closure of the Bierkeller shortly afterwards, the 2018 show was moved again, this time to the bigger SWX venue, where the 2019 show was also held.  The Bristol Post, naming Brookfield in their "60 Coolest People in Bristol" article, said "There aren't many musicians in Bristol who could sell out the 1,100-capacity SWX, but he does."  

During the COVID-19 pandemic, Brookfield was forced to shield due to his Type 1 diabetes, and was one of the first artists to write and publish an entire album about the pandemic which was appropriately called Lockdown and was released on 2 October 2020.  While unable to tour during the pandemic, he played a weekly live stream entitled "Live from the Lockdown", which celebrated its one-year anniversary with the 52nd show on 12 March 2021. Brookfield released his eighth album, Idiomatic on  1 November 2021, which reached No.10 in the UK Download Charts.

The Company of Thieves

Brookfield plays semi-regular shows with a full band, the line-up of which is as follows;
Ben Wain (fiddle)
Nick Parker (mandolin)
Chris Webb (guitar)
Leks Wood (drums)
Jon Buckett (keyboards)
Tom Granville, (bass)

Discography
Brookfield has released eight original studio albums, plus four "Solo Acoustic Guy" albums with re-workings of his previous songs.  He has also produced a number of live albums.

Studio
Trial and Error (2011)
Tell It to the Beer (2012)
In The Company Of Thieves (2013)
True and Fast (2015)
I Know My Place (2016)
Lostfolk (2019)
Lockdown (2020)
Idiomatic (2021)

Reworkings
Solo Acoustic Guy (2015)
Solo Acoustic Guy II (2016)
Solo Acoustic Guy III (2017)
Aged Revolt (split with Jake Martin, covering each other's songs, 2018)
Solo Acoustic Guy IV (2021)

References

External links
 BBC Music artist page

1979 births
Living people
English male singer-songwriters
21st-century English singers
21st-century British male singers